KDLL is a non-commercial radio station in Kenai, Alaska, broadcasting on 91.9 FM. The station airs public radio programming from the National Public Radio network and the BBC World Service.  KDLL also airs some locally originated programming.

External links
KDLL's Website

DLL
NPR member stations
DLL
Radio stations established in 1972